Senator Durand may refer to:

Frank Durand (1895–1978), New Jersey State Senate
Robert Durand (born 1953), Massachusetts State Senate

See also
Isabelle Durant (born 1954), Senate of Belgium